The women's 10,000 metres competition at the 2012 Summer Olympics in London, United Kingdom was held at Olympic Stadium on 3 August.

The race started off conservatively, led by the three Japanese runners, trailed by Britton who broke away to a 15-meter lead 800 metres into the race, though the peloton reeled that in.  After the first 8 laps, the Kenyan and Ethiopian runners moved to the front as other runners dropped off the back, one by one.  The field whittled itself down to just the three Kenyan and Ethiopian athletes, trailed by Eshete (Ethiopian born, running for Bahrain).  Eshete would set the Bahrain national record in this race.  With 7 laps to go, Chepkirui dropped out.  In that same move Oljira and Eshete lost a step of contact and were separated from the field.  Led by Kidane pushing the pace, it turned into a dual meet.  With three laps to go, Kipyego edged into the lead with her move covered by the defending champion Dibaba.  World champion Cheruiyot trailed but didn't look like she had the power to push ahead.  In the turn with under 600 metres to go, Dibaba put the hammer down, passing Kipyego decisively and charging away.  The last lap was a victory sprint for Dibaba with no challenger in sight.

Competition format
Only a final, without preliminary heats, was held.

Schedule
All times are British Summer Time (UTC+1)

Records
, the existing World and Olympic records were as follows.

Results
Official Photofinish 3 August 2012.

Elizaveta Grechishnikova of Russia  originally finished 19th but was later disqualified for doping

References

Athletics at the 2012 Summer Olympics
10,000 metres at the Olympics
2012 in women's athletics
Women's events at the 2012 Summer Olympics